Crunt is a studio album by the American band Crunt, released in 1994. It was the band's only album. An estimated 20,000 copies had been sold worldwide as of January 1995.

Critical reception

Trouser Press called the album an "enthusiastic if offhand outing," while acknowledging Simins's "typically muscular contribution." The Guardian thought that "the resolutely low-fi recording quality mashes the sound into a muddy sub-heavy metal broth that pleads for the description 'bloody racket', but this has its own bizarre charm." The Columbus Dispatch deemed it "a loud, distorted, violent, unpretty, harsh, nasty slab of music," writing that "the over-the-top rock 'n' roll here is mostly humorous."

Stephen Howell, in his AllMusic review, wrote: "Crunt proves that three chords and a childish mentality can be taken a long way. This is simplistic rock & roll that manages to create a fast and memorable hook for anyone within earshot."

Track listing
All songs by Crunt
Theme from Crunt
Swine*
Blackheart
Unglued
Changing My Mind
Snap Out of It
Sexy
Punishment
Spam
Elephant
 * indicates single

Personnel
Stuart "Spasm" Gray - vocals, guitar
Kat Bjelland - bass, vocals
Russell Simins - drums, vocals

References

External links
Crunt

Crunt albums
1994 albums
Trance Syndicate albums